The Strega European Prize is an annual literary award given to a novel in Italian translation by a European author who has received national recognition in their home country. Established in 2014, it is administered—like the prestigious Strega Prize for Italian literature—by the Maria and Goffredo Bellonci Foundation.

Winners
 2014 – Marcos Giralt Torrente, Il tempo della vita (Tiempo de vida), translated from Spanish by Pierpaolo Marchetti
 2015 – Katja Petrowskaja, Forse Esther (Vielleicht Esther), translated from German by Ada Vigliani 
 2016 – Annie Ernaux, Gli anni (Les années), translated from French by Lorenzo Flabbi
 2017 – Jenny Erpenbeck, Voci del verbo andare (Gehen, ging, gegangen), translated from German by Ada Vigliani
 2018 – Fernando Aramburu, Patria, translated from Spanish by Bruno Arpaia 
 2019 – David Diop for Fratelli d’anima
 2020 – Judith Schalansky for Inventario di alcune cose perdute
 2021 – Georgi Gospodinov for Cronorifugio
 2022 – Mikhail Shishkin for Punto di Fuga and Amelie Nothomb for Primo sangue

References

Italian literary awards
2014 establishments in Italy
Awards established in 2014
Fiction awards
Translation awards